Charlie James Taylor (born 1 December 1985) is a professional footballer who was last attached to Billericay Town.

Career
Taylor started his career as a trainee with Charlton Athletic, Crystal Palace and Nottingham Forest, before dropping into non-League football. Taylor signed for Welling United before leaving in 2004 to join Hornchurch. He then had spells at Fisher Athletic, Margate and Dulwich Hamlet before joining Grays Athletic in 2009. He scored once in 11 games for Grays, away at Crawley Town in the 1–1 draw in the Conference National on 29 August.

In July 2010, Taylor had an unsuccessful trial with Championship club Bristol City, before eventually signing for Barnet on 31 August 2010 from Isthmian League Premier Division club Sutton United. Taylor made his debut on 25 September for Barnet in their 2–2 away draw with Morecambe in League Two, replacing Steve Kabba in the 65th minute as a substitute.

Taylor was given a three-match ban for spitting at an opponent in a game against Aldershot Town in October 2011.

Taylor was sent off for violent conduct in the Football League Trophy Area Final against Swindon Town in February 2012 after coming on as a substitute and playing for 10 minutes. It was announced on 13 April 2012, that Taylor had left the club by mutual consent.

In October 2012 he joined Billericay Town.

Style of play
Football manager, Mark Stimson described Taylor as "a striker who plays off the shoulder".

References

External links
Barnet profile

Living people
1985 births
English footballers
Footballers from Lewisham
Charlton Athletic F.C. players
Crystal Palace F.C. players
Nottingham Forest F.C. players
Welling United F.C. players
Hornchurch F.C. players
Margate F.C. players
Dulwich Hamlet F.C. players
Grays Athletic F.C. players
Sutton United F.C. players
Barnet F.C. players
Eastbourne Borough F.C. players
Billericay Town F.C. players
English Football League players
National League (English football) players
Isthmian League players
Association football forwards